Giulia Rulli (born 3 June 1991) is an Italian basketball player. She competed in the 2020 Summer Olympics.

References

1991 births
Living people
3x3 basketball players at the 2020 Summer Olympics
Basketball players from Rome
Italian women's basketball players
Italian women's 3x3 basketball players
Olympic 3x3 basketball players of Italy